The Franciscan Bowl is the name given to the Marian–Saint Francis football rivalry.  It is an American college football rivalry game played annually by the Marian Knights football team of Marian University and the Saint Francis Cougars football team of the University of Saint Francis. The teams compete for the Franciscan Bowl Trophy.  The Knights and the Cougars first met in 2007 and have been regular opponents in Mid-States Football Association’s Mideast League (MEL), meeting annually since that first encounter.

The rivalry is a contest between two perennial NAIA powerhouses; between them, they have won 4 of the most recent 10 (including three straight from 2015-2017) NAIA national championships (2012, 2015, 2016, 2017), in addition to 4 other national championship appearances by one or the other.

Marian leads the overall series 11-7. Marian won the most recent contest (2022) 37-10 in Fort Wayne.  The 2019 victory marked the first time in the four trophy contests that the home team has won the game.

History of the Trophy
A spirited rivalry has developed on the field since the first meeting in 2007.  USF President Sister M. Elise Kriss and Marian President Daniel J. Elsener recognized that with two Catholic universities in the Franciscan tradition, this game provided an opportunity to spotlight the schools’ values and the spirit of goodwill in competition. In fact, St. Francis of Assisi was known to challenge the friars who followed him to compete in their own practice of virtue. This same good-natured competition inspired the Franciscan Bowl.  

“This game is about more than just winning a trophy,” said Kriss. “USF is excited about having the chance to compete against a university that shares so many of our values and traditions, and we know that Marian feels the same every year when this game shows up on the schedule.”

Series statistics

Game results

 * denotes postseason, playoff contest

References

NAIA football rivalries
Marian Knights football
Saint Francis Cougars football
2016 establishments in Indiana